Samsung Plaza (hangul:삼성플라자), renamed as AK Plaza Bundang Store on March 2, 2009, is a shopping mall located in Seohyeon-dong, Bundang, Seongnam-si, South Korea. The building is 98m or about 32 stories tall.

Samsung Corporation (hangul:삼성물산) opened Samsung Plaza Store No. 1, a multi-functional shopping center. It is also equipped with facilities such as the lobby, playrooms and cafes, plus facilities for the handicapped. Samsung Plaza consists of a department store, specialty stores and cultural, educational and entertainment facilities.

Samsung Plaza has grown substantially, the total sale of 1997 was 270 billion won and in 2004 it was, doubled, 540 billion won. In 2005, Bundang Samsung Plaza ranked 6th in amount of sales in South Korea.

In February 2007, Samsung Corporation signed a contract with ARD Holdings, Inc. to sell  Samsung Plaza Department Store.

See also
Samsung Group
AK Plaza

References

External links
Samsung Plaza Official Website
Bundang Samsung Plaza
Samsung Plaza : Official Seoul City Tourism

Plaza
Bundang
Shopping malls in South Korea
Retail companies of South Korea
Department stores of South Korea